Oscar Natalio "Ringo" Bonavena (September 25, 1942 – May 22, 1976) was an Argentine heavyweight professional boxer with a career record of 58 wins, 9 losses and 1 draw. A rugged, wild-swinging puncher, he was nicknamed "Ringo" because of his Beatles haircut, and enjoyed professional success in both Argentina and the United States. He is remembered for giving Joe Frazier and Muhammad Ali hard fought bouts.

Life and pro career
Oscar Natalio Bonavena was born in Buenos Aires to two Italian immigrants. He was a professional boxer, Argentinian and South American champion. He also participated in several Argentinian TV programs such as the Pepe Biondi Show.

Early career
Bonavena began his early career in New York City under the management of World War II hero and dentist Marvin Goldberg.

His pro debut was on February 1, 1964. He soon racked up a quick string of early knockouts, but was overmatched early, sometimes fighting twice a month, and lost by a decision in February 1965 to then-highly rated Zora Folley. Bonavena was in only his 15th contest, and was far too inexperienced to then really tackle a top veteran like Folley. It was a one-sided contest, with Bonavena getting up off the deck from a wicked right hand. Even courageous Oscar looked discouraged and shaken at times in the later rounds. However, three years later -- with far more experience and training -- he won their rematch by decision.

After that, he returned to Argentina, where his winning and knockout streak continued. But in mid-1966 he was enticed back to New York, and the free-swinging Bonavena soon ran into trouble outside the ring. He called Muhammad Ali a black kangaroo and even a chicken for draft dodging. Ali was furious. Oscar was one of the few people to upstage Ali in pre-fight press conferences. When, much later, he saw Ali seated ringside at the George Foreman–Ken Norton fight, he went over and started a big slanging match. In his pre-fight press conference with Frazier, Bonavena needled effectively by implying that Frazier had a personal hygiene problem. He would start sniffing and grimace. Lawsuits were brought about by reporters with broken cameras; and other such "colorful" behavior. He was always volatile, as trainers soon discovered.

Big name contests, Chuvalo and Frazier
Bonavena first came to wide public attention after a fine performance: defeating rated contender and Canadian champion George Chuvalo, boxing technically better than expected, and later going the distance against the young hard-hitting great Joe Frazier.  In this, their first fight, Bonavena had the future champion down twice in the second round.

WBA elimination contests
In 1967, after the World Boxing Association stripped Muhammad Ali of the title for refusing to be inducted into the U.S. military, Bonavena participated in that sanctioning body's 1967 tournament to crown a new heavyweight champion. In a strong performance he decked favoured European champion Karl Mildenberger four times, winning by a decision in Frankfurt, West Germany. But he was himself knocked down twice and clearly outboxed by eventual tournament winner Jimmy Ellis in the semi-finals in Louisville, losing by unanimous decision in an upset. Many deemed it the best win of Ellis's career.

World Title shot, the Frazier rematch

The following year, in 1968, after outpointing Leotis Martin, he got a rematch with Frazier for the heavyweight title in Philadelphia. After a grueling fifteen rounds Bonavena lost the rematch by decision, fighting more defensively than previous. He left with a seriously battered face, as photographed in the Ring magazine. In 1969, he got a draw in a rematch with talented Gregorio Peralta, who he'd outpointed four years earlier for the Argentine title.

Versus Ali
In December 1970, he fought Ali at Madison Square Garden, in the former champ's second bout after his three-year layoff. Bonavena absorbed punishment throughout but fought well, getting through with various head and body punches. With just under 1:30 left in the 15th and final round, Ali caught Oscar rushing in and decked him with a perfectly placed left hook. Bonavena got up, but was clearly not fully recovered. Ali decked him twice more, and the fight was automatically stopped under the three knockdown rule, giving Ali a TKO (technical knockout). The ending was somewhat controversial, as Ali stood over Bonavena as Bonavena was getting up, never going to a neutral corner as the rules of boxing require, which allowed Ali to quickly knockdown Bonavena twice more and automatically end the fight. After the second knockdown, the referee appears to be attempting to guide Ali to a neutral corner, but Ali brushes the referee's arm away and pursues a wobbly Bonavena.

Other matches
After the loss to Ali in 1970, he had a brutally tough match with underrated Alvin Lewis, being decked multiple times but eventually winning by disqualification. Bonavena fought intermittently for the next few years. A gregarious party man, he enjoyed life fully, at the cost of his professional boxing career.

Eventually losses to Floyd Patterson in 1972 and Ron Lyle in 1974 effectively put him to lower ranking contender status, although he did well enough in both these matches. In the Patterson fight he broke his left hand early, possibly after decking Patterson in the fourth, and remained an advancing threat to the final bell. It was around 1973 a possible match with a then on the rise Ken Norton was being planned but, unfortunately for fans, it never materialised.

On February 26, 1976, overweight and sluggish Bonavena fought what would be his last fight, winning a ten-round decision over the unranked Billy Joiner in Reno.

Death
On 22 May 1976 Bonavena was shot dead at the age of 33 by a security guard at the Mustang Ranch near Reno, Nevada, after having become involved in a conflict with its owner. His body was returned to Argentina to lie in state at the Luna Park sports arena in Buenos Aires, where 150,000 people filed by, afterwards being buried in La Chacarita Cemetery in Buenos Aires.

Professional boxing record

| style="text-align:center;" colspan="8"|58 Wins (44 Knockouts), 9 Defeats, 1 Draw
|-  style="text-align:center; background:#e3e3e3;"
|  style="border-style:none none solid solid; "|Res.
|  style="border-style:none none solid solid; "|Record
|  style="border-style:none none solid solid; "|Opponent
|  style="border-style:none none solid solid; "|Type
|  style="border-style:none none solid solid; "|Rd., Time
|  style="border-style:none none solid solid; "|Date
|  style="border-style:none none solid solid; "|Location
|  style="border-style:none none solid solid; "|Notes
|- align=center
|Win
|58-9-1
|align=left| Billy Joiner
|
|
|
|align=left|
|align=left|
|- align=center
|Win
|57-9-1
|align=left| Reinaldo Gorosito
|
|
|
|align=left|
|align=left|
|- align=center
|Win
|56-9-1
|align=left| Mani Vaka
|
|
|
|align=left|
|align=left|
|- align=center
|Win
|55-9-1
|align=left| Oliver Wright
|
|
|
|align=left|
|align=left|
|- align=center
|Win
|54-9-1
|align=left| Bob Mashburn
|
|
|
|align=left|
|align=left|
|- align=center
|Win
|53-9-1
|align=left| Larry Renaud
|
|
|
|align=left|
|align=left|
|- align=center
|Win
|52-9-1
|align=left| Larry Middleton
|
|
|
|align=left|
|align=left|
|- align=center
|Loss
|51-9-1
|align=left| Ron Lyle
|
|
|
|align=left|
|align=left|
|- align=center
|Win
|51-8-1
|align=left| Terry Sorrell
|
|
|
|align=left|
|align=left|
|- align=center
|Win
|50-8-1
|align=left| Lou Bailey
|
|
|
|align=left|
|align=left|
|- align=center
|Win
|49-8-1
|align=left| Roy Wallace
|
|
|
|align=left|
|align=left|
|- align=center
|Win
|48-8-1
|align=left| Leroy Caldwell
|
|
|
|align=left|
|align=left|
|- align=center
|Loss
|47-8-1
|align=left| Floyd Patterson
|
|
|
|align=left|
|align=left|
|- align=center
|Win
|47-7-1
|align=left| Alvin Lewis
|
|
|
|align=left|
|align=left|
|- align=center
|Loss
|46-7-1
|align=left| Muhammad Ali
|
|
|
|align=left|
|align=left|
|- align=center
|Win
|46-6-1
|align=left| Luis Pires
|
|
|
|align=left|
|align=left|
|- align=center
|Win
|45-6-1
|align=left| James J Woody
|
|
|
|align=left|
|align=left|
|- align=center
|Win
|44-6-1
|align=left| Manuel Ramos
|
|
|
|align=left|
|align=left|
|- align=center
|Win
|43-6-1
|align=left| José Menno
|
|
|
|align=left|
|align=left|
|- align=center
|Win
|42-6-1
|align=left| Santiago Lovell
|
|
|
|align=left|
|align=left|
|- align=center
|Loss
|41-6-1
|align=left| Miguel Angel Paez
|
|
|
|align=left|
|align=left|
|- align=center
|Win
|41-5-1
|align=left| Santiago Lovell
|
|
|
|align=left|
|align=left|
|- align=center
|style="background:#abcdef;"|Draw
|40-5-1
|align=left| Gregorio Peralta
|
|
|
|align=left|
|align=left|
|- align=center
|Win
|40-5
|align=left| Wilhelm Von Homburg
|
|
|
|align=left|
|align=left|
|- align=center
|Win
|39-5
|align=left| Luis Pires
|
|
|
|align=left|
|align=left|
|- align=center
|Loss
|38-5
|align=left| Joe Frazier
|
|
|
|align=left|
|align=left|
|- align=center
|Win
|38-4
|align=left| Jim Fletcher
|
|
|
|align=left|
|align=left|
|- align=center
|Win
|37-4
|align=left| Leotis Martin
|
|
|
|align=left|
|align=left|
|- align=center
|Win
|36-4
|align=left| Zora Folley
|
|
|
|align=left|
|align=left|
|- align=center
|Win
|35-4
|align=left| Roberto Davila
|
|
|
|align=left|
|align=left|
|- align=center
|Win
|34-4
|align=left| Lee Carr
|
|
|
|align=left|
|align=left|
|- align=center
|Win
|33-4
|align=left| Alberto Benassi
|
|
|
|align=left|
|align=left|
|- align=center
|Win
|32-4
|align=left| Felipe Pedro Marich
|
|
|
|align=left|
|align=left|
|- align=center
|Loss
|31-4
|align=left| Jimmy Ellis
|
|
|
|align=left|
|align=left|
|- align=center
|Win
|31-3
|align=left| Karl Mildenberger
|
|
|
|align=left|
|align=left|
|- align=center
|Win
|30-3
|align=left| Carlos Vazquez
|
|
|
|align=left|
|align=left|
|- align=center
|Win
|29-3
|align=left| Luis Pires
|
|
|
|align=left|
|align=left|
|- align=center
|Win
|28-3
|align=left| Pablo Sagrispanti
|
|
|
|align=left|
|align=left|
|- align=center
|Win
|27-3
|align=left| Hubert Hilton
|
|
|
|align=left|
|align=left|
|- align=center
|Win
|26-3
|align=left| Jose Giorgetti
|
|
|
|align=left|
|align=left|
|- align=center
|Win
|25-3
|align=left| Roberto Veliz
|
|
|
|align=left|
|align=left|
|- align=center
|Win
|24-3
|align=left| Alberto Benassi
|
|
|
|align=left|
|align=left|
|- align=center
|Win
|23-3
|align=left| Amos Johnson
|
|
|
|align=left|
|align=left|
|- align=center
|Win
|22-3
|align=left| Alberto Benassi
|
|
|
|align=left|
|align=left|
|- align=center
|Loss
|21-3
|align=left| Joe Frazier
|
|
|
|align=left|
|align=left|
|- align=center
|Win
|21-2
|align=left| George Chuvalo
|
|
|
|align=left|
|align=left|
|- align=center
|Win
|20-2
|align=left| Jose Giorgetti
|
|
|
|align=left|
|align=left|
|- align=center
|Loss
|19-2
|align=left| Jose Giorgetti
|
|
|
|align=left|
|align=left|
|- align=center
|Win
|19-1
|align=left| Bruno Segura
|
|
|
|align=left|
|align=left|
|- align=center
|Win
|18-1
|align=left| Billy Daniels
|
|
|
|align=left|
|align=left|
|- align=center
|Win
|17-1
|align=left| Hector Wilson
|
|
|
|align=left|
|align=left|
|- align=center
|Win
|16-1
|align=left| Pablo Sagrispanti
|
|
|
|align=left|
|align=left|
|- align=center
|Win
|15-1
|align=left| Gregorio Peralta
|
|
|
|align=left|
|align=left|
|- align=center
|Win
|14-1
|align=left| Alberto Gonzales
|
|
|
|align=left|
|align=left|
|- align=center
|Win
|13-1
|align=left| Eduardo Cartelli
|
|
|
|align=left|
|align=left|
|- align=center
|Win
|12-1
|align=left| Rodolfo Diaz
|
|
|
|align=left|
|align=left|
|- align=center
|Win
|11-1
|align=left| Rogelio Gregorutti
|
|
|
|align=left|
|align=left|
|- align=center
|Win
|10-1
|align=left| Carlos Vazquez
|
|
|
|align=left|
|align=left|
|- align=center
|Win
|9-1
|align=left| Rene Sosa
|
|
|
|align=left|
|align=left|
|- align=center
|Loss
|8-1
|align=left| Zora Folley
|
|
|
|align=left|
|align=left|
|- align=center
|Win
|8-0
|align=left| Billy Stephan
|
|
|
|align=left|
|align=left|
|- align=center
|Win
|7-0
|align=left| Dick Wipperman
|
|
|
|align=left|
|align=left|
|- align=center
|Win
|6-0
|align=left| Tom McNeeley
|
|
|
|align=left|
|align=left|
|- align=center
|Win
|5-0
|align=left| Byron Stoimenides
|
|
|
|align=left|
|align=left|
|- align=center
|Win
|4-0
|align=left| Leslie Borden
|
|
|
|align=left|
|align=left|
|- align=center
|Win
|3-0
|align=left| Wendell Newton
|
|
|
|align=left|
|align=left|
|- align=center
|Win
|2-0
|align=left| Everett Copeland
|
|
|
|align=left|
|align=left|
|- align=center
|Win
|1-0
|align=left| Lou Hicks
|
|
|
|align=left|
|align=left|
|}

See also
Luis Ángel Firpo
José María Gatica
Justo Suárez

References

 Nevada's Most Infamous Brothel, Mustang Ranch, Back In Business, Fox News
 Woman Who Operated Mustang Ranch Dies, Spokesman-Review, September 9, 1992

External links
 

1942 births
1976 deaths
Heavyweight boxers
Boxers from Buenos Aires
Argentine expatriate sportspeople in the United States
Argentine people of Italian descent
Male murder victims
Argentine people murdered abroad
Argentine murder victims
People murdered in Nevada
Deaths by firearm in Nevada
Burials at La Chacarita Cemetery
Argentine male boxers